Dimitris Aslanidis (born 16 August 1989) is a Greek footballer. He currently plays for Asteras Magoula F.C., in the Football League.

Club career

Aslanidis started his career in P.A.O.N.E. during 2005 before being transferred to Iraklis Thessaloniki in 2006, he later moved to Olympiakos Volou before returning to P.A.O.N.E. and spending two years to Anagennisi Epanomi. In 2012, he was transferred to Aris Thessaloniki.

Personal

In 2011, he participated in the reality show FAB 5, the Greek edition of Queer Eye for the Straight Guy.

References

External links
 
Myplayer.gr Profile

1989 births
Living people
Greek footballers
Footballers from Thessaloniki
Super League Greece players
Iraklis Thessaloniki F.C. players
Olympiacos Volos F.C. players
Aris Thessaloniki F.C. players
Panionios F.C. players
Association football midfielders